The flora of the Falkland Islands comprises 178 native species (marked * in the list below), 219 non-native species ('†') and 6 of uncertain status. Thirteen species (marked in bold) are endemic to the islands, and two – Gamochaeta malvinensis and Polystichum mohrioides – are near-endemics, being also found on other nearby islands.

Ferns and fern allies
Huperzia fuegiana, fir clubmoss*
Lycopodium confertum, creeping clubmoss*
Lycopodium magellanicum, common clubmoss*
Ophioglossum crotalophoroides, adder's-tongue*
Equisetum arvense, field horsetail†
Adiantum chilense, maidenhair-fern*
Asplenium dareoides, spleenwort*
Asplenium scolopendrium, hart's-tongue fern
Blechnum magellanicum, tall-fern*
Blechnum penna-marina, small-fern*
Botrychium dusenii, Dusen's moonwort*
Cystopteris fragilis, brittle bladder-fern*
Dryopteris dilatata, broad buckler-fern†
Dryopteris filix-mas, male-fern†
Grammitis poeppigiana, strap-fern*
Hymenophyllum caespitosum, red-haired filmy-fern*
Hymenophyllum darwinii, Darwin's filmy-fern*
Hymenophyllum falklandicum, Falkland filmy-fern*
Hymenophyllum tortuosum, twisted filmy-fern*
Hypolepis poeppigii, bramble-fern*
Parablechnum cordatum, Chilean tall-fern*
Polystichum mohrioides, shield-fern*
Rumohra adiantiformis, leathery shield-fern*
Schizaea fistulosa, comb fern*
Sticherus cryptocarpa, coral-fern*

Gymnosperms
Cupressus macrocarpa, Monterey cypress†
Picea sitchensis, Sitka spruce†
Pinus contorta, lodgepole pine†
Pinus echinata, shortleaf pine†
Pinus muricata, bishop pine†
Pinus nigra, Austrian pine†
Pinus radiata, Monterey pine†
Pinus sylvestris, Scots pine†

Angiosperms

Ranunculales

Berberidaceae
Berberis microphylla, calafate†
Papaveraceae
Fumaria muralis, common ramping-fumitory†
Papaver dubium subsp. dubium, long-headed poppy†
Papaver dubium subsp. lecoqii, yellow-juiced poppy†
Ranunculaceae
Hamadryas argentea, silvery buttercup*
Psychrophila appendiculata, dwarf marigold*
Psychrophila sagittata, arrow-leaved marigold*
Ranunculus acaulis, Skottsberg's buttercup*
Ranunculus biternatus, Antarctic buttercup*
Ranunculus hydrophilus, marsh buttercup*
Ranunculus maclovianus, Falkland buttercup*
Ranunculus pseudotrullifolius, false ladle-leaved buttercup*
Ranunculus repens, creeping buttercup†
Ranunculus sceleratus, celery-leaved buttercup†
Ranunculus sericocephalus, silky buttercup*
Ranunculus trullifolius, ladle-leaved buttercup*

Gunnerales
Gunnera magellanica, pigvine*

Saxifragales
Crassulaceae
Crassula moschata,* stonecrop*
Sedum acre, biting stonecrop†
Sedum forsterianum, rock stonecrop†
Grossulariaceae
Ribes magellanicum, Magellanic currant†
Ribes nigrum, black currant†
Ribes rubrum, red currant†
Ribes uva-crispa, gooseberry†
Haloragaceae
Myriophyllum quitense, water-milfoil*
Saxifragaceae
Saxifraga magellanica, saxifrage*
Saxifraga × urbium, London pride†

Fabales
Cytisus scoparius, broom†
Glycyrrhiza astragalina,†
Lotus corniculatus, bird's-foot-trefoil†
Lotus pedunculatus, greater bird's-foot-trefoil†
Lupinus arboreus, tree lupin†
Medicago sativa, lucerne†
Trifolium arvense, hare's-foot clover†
Trifolium aureum, golden clover†
Trifolium dubium, lesser trefoil†
Trifolium fragiferum, strawberry clover†
Trifolium hybridum, alsike clover†
Trifolium pratense, red clover†
Trifolium repens, white clover†
Trifolium striatum, knotted clover†
Ulex europaeus, gorse†
Ulex gallii, western gorse†
Vicia cracca, tufted vetch†
Vicia sativa, common vetch†
Vicia sepium, bush vetch†

Rosales
Rosaceae
Acaena antarctica, Antarctic prickly-burr*
Acaena lucida,* yarrow*
Acaena magellanica, prickly-burr*
Acaena ovalifolia, oval-leaved prickly-burr*
Acaena pumila, dwarf prickly-burr*
Aphanes arvensis, parsley-piert†
Malus domestica, apple†
Potentilla anserina, silverweed†
Prunus domestica, plum†
Rosa canina, dog-rose†
Rosa rubiginosa, sweet-briar†
Rosa rugosa, Japanese rose†
Rubus geoides, Falkland strawberry*
Rubus idaeus, raspberry†
Sorbus aria, whitebeam†
Sorbus aucuparia, rowan†
Urticaceae
Urtica urens, annual stinging-nettle†

Fagales
Castanea sativa, sweet chestnut†
Nothofagus betuloides, southern beech†
Quercus robur, pedunculate oak†

Celastrales
Maytenus magellanica, pickwood†

Oxalidales
Oxalis enneaphylla, scurvygrass*

Malpighiales
Elatinaceae
Elatine triandra, waterwort*
Euphorbiaceae
Euphorbia peplus, petty spurge†
Salicaceae
Populus × canescens, grey poplar†
Salix cinerea, grey willow†
Salix gmelinii, Gmelin's willow†
Salix viminalis, osier†
Salix × rubra, green-leaved willow†
Violaceae
Viola arvensis, field pansy†
Viola maculata, common violet*
Viola magellanica, Fuegian violet*
Viola tricolor, heartsease / wild pansy†
Viola tridentata, mountain violet*
Viola × wittrockiana, pansy†

Geraniales
Erodium cicutarium, common storks-bill†
Geranium molle, dove's-foot crane's-bill†
Geranium pusillum, small-flowered crane's-bill†
Geranium robertianum, herb robert†

Myrtales
Myrtaceae
Eucalyptus gunnii, cider gum†
Myrteola nummularia, teaberry*
Onagraceae
Epilobium ciliatum, American willowherb†
Epilobium obscurum, short-fruited willowherb†
Fuchsia 'Corallina', large-flowered fuchsia†
Fuchsia magellanica, fuchsia†

Malvales
Sidalcea malviflora, Greek mallow†
Drapetes muscosus, drapetes*

Brassicales
Armoracia rusticana, horseradish†
Brassica napus, swede†
Brassica oleracea, cabbage†
Brassica rapa, turnip†
Capsella bursa-pastoris, shepherd's-purse†
Cardamine glacialis, bitter-cress*
Cardamine hirsuta, hairy bitter-cress†
Cochlearia officinalis, English scurvygrass†
Draba funiculosa, whitlowgrass*
Draba magellanica, Fuegian whitlowgrass*
Erophila verna, introduced whitlowgrass†
Hesperis matronalis, dame's-violet†
Lepidium didymum, lesser swine-cress*
Nasturtium officinale, water-cress†
Phlebolobium maclovianum, Falkland rock-cress*

Santalales
Nanodea muscosa, foxberry*

Caryophyllales
Amaranthaceae
Atriplex patula, common orache†
Atriplex prostrata, spear-leaved orache†
Chenopodium macrospermum, goosefoot*
Suaeda argentinensis, shrubby seablite*
Caryophyllaceae
Cerastium arvense, field mouse-ear*
Cerastium fontanum, common mouse-ear†
Cerastium glomeratum, sticky mouse-ear†
Colobanthus quitensis, Andean pearlwort*
Colobanthus subulatus, emerald-bog*
Sagina filicaulis, annual pearlwort†
Sagina procumbens, procumbent pearlwort†
Silene latifolia, white campion†
Silene uniflora, bladder campion†
Spergula arvensis, corn spurrey†
Spergularia marina, lesser sea-spurrey*
Stellaria alsine, bog stitchwort†
Stellaria debilis,* stitchwort*
Stellaria graminea, lesser stitchwort†
Stellaria media, chickweed†
Droseraceae
Drosera uniflora, sundew*
Montiaceae
Calandrinia nitida,*
Claytonia perfoliata, spring beauty†
Montia fontana, blinks*
Plumbaginaceae
Armeria maritima, thrift*
Polygonaceae
Polygonum aviculare, knotgrass†
Polygonum maritimum, sea knotgrass*
Rheum × hybridum, rhubarb†
Rumex acetosa, sorrel†
Rumex acetosella subsp. acetosella, sheep's sorrel†
Rumex acetosella subsp. pyrenaicus, round-seeded sheep's sorrel†
Rumex crispus, curled dock†
Rumex hydrolapathum, water dock†
Rumex longifolius, northern dock†
Rumex magellanicus, southern dock*
Rumex obtusifolius, broad-leaved dock†

Ericales
Ericaceae
Calluna vulgaris, heather†
Empetrum rubrum, diddle-dee*
Gaultheria antarctica, Antarctic mountainberry*
Gaultheria antarctica × pumila, mountainberry hybrid*
Gaultheria pumila, mountainberry*
Primulaceae
Anagallis alternifolia, pimpernel*
Primula magellanica, dusty miller*
Samolus repens, shore pimpernel*

Gentianales
Gentianaceae
Centaurium pulchellum, lesser centaury†
Gentianella magellanica, felwort*
Rubiaceae
Galium antarcticum, Antarctic bedstraw*
Galium aparine, cleavers†
Galium saxatile, heath bedstraw†
Nertera granadensis, beadplant*

Boraginaceae
Myosotis arvensis, field forget-me-not†
Myosotis discolor, changing forget-me-not†
Myosotis ramosissima, early forget-me-not†

Solanales
Solanum tuberosum, potato†

Lamiales

Calceolariaceae
Calceolaria biflora, yellow lady's slipper*
Calceolaria fothergillii, lady's slipper*
Callitrichaceae
Callitriche antarctica, water-starwort*
Lamiaceae
Lamium amplexicaule, henbit dead-nettle†
Lamium hybridum, cut-leaved dead-nettle†
Lamium purpureum, red dead-nettle†
Mentha spicata, spearmint†
Mentha × piperita, peppermint†
Mentha × villosa, apple-mint†
Prunella vulgaris, selfheal†
Scutellaria nummulariifolia, skullcap*
Orobanchaceae
Euphrasia antarctica, eyebright*
Euphrasia confusa, European eyebright†
Parentucellia viscosa, yellow bartsia†
Plantaginaceae
Littorella australis, shoreweed*
Plantago barbata, thrift plantain*
Plantago coronopus, buck's-horn plantain†
Plantago lanceolata, ribwort plantain†
Plantago major, greater plantain†
Plantago maritima, sea plantain*
Plantago media, hoary plantain†
Plantago moorei, Moore's plantain*
Scrophulariaceae
Limosella australis, southern mudwort*
Veronicaceae
Digitalis purpurea, foxglove†
Veronica agrestis, green field speedwell†
Veronica arvensis, wall speedwell†
Veronica elliptica,* boxwood*
Veronica officinalis, heath speedwell†
Veronica serpyllifolia, thyme-leaved speedwell†
Veronica × franciscana, hybrid boxwood†

Asterales

Asteraceae
Abrotanella emarginata, notched moss-bog*
Achillea millefolium, yarrow†
Agoseris coronopifolium, Fuegian hawks-beard*
Anthemis punctata, Sicilian chamomile†
Baccharis magellanica, Christmas-bush*
Bellis perennis, daisy†
Chevreulia lycopodioides, clubmoss cudweed*
Chiliotrichum diffusum, fachine*
Cichorium intybus, chicory†
Cirsium arvense, creeping thistle†
Cirsium vulgare, spear thistle†
Crepis capillaris, smooth hawks-beard†
Erigeron incertus, hairy daisy*
Gamochaeta americana, American cudweed*
Gamochaeta antarctica, Antarctic cudweed*
Gamochaeta malvinensis, Falkland cudweed*
Gamochaeta spiciformis, spiked cudweed*
Gnaphalium luteoalbum, Jersey cudweed†
Hieracium antarcticum, Antarctic hawkweed*
Hieracium patagonicum, Patagonian hawkweed*
Hypochaeris arenaria, sand cat's-ear*
Hypochaeris radicata, common cat's-ear†
Lagenophora nudicaulis, dwarf daisy*
Leontodon hispidus, rough hawkbit†
Leptinella scariosa, buttonweed*
Leucanthemum vulgare, oxeye daisy†
Leucanthemum × superbum, Shasta daisy†
Leucheria suaveolens, vanilla daisy*
Matricaria discoidea, pineappleweed†
Nassauvia gaudichaudii, coastal nassauvia*
Nassauvia serpens, snakeplant*
Perezia recurvata, Falkland lavender*
Pilosella aurantiaca, orange hawkweed, fox-and-cubs†
Pilosella officinarum, mouse-ear-hawkweed†
Senecio candidans, sea cabbage*
Senecio jacobaea, European ragwort†
Senecio littoralis, woolly Falkland daisy*
Senecio squalidus, Oxford ragwort†
Senecio sylvaticus, heath groundsel†
Senecio vaginatus, smooth Falkland daisy*
Senecio vulgaris, groundsel†
Sonchus asper, prickly sow-thistle†
Sonchus oleraceus, smooth sow-thistle†
Symphyotrichum vahlii, marsh daisy*
Tanacetum parthenium cv. 'Aureum', golden feverfew†
Tanacetum vulgare, tansy†
Taraxacum gilliesii, Gillie's dandelion*
Taraxacum officinale, dandelion†
Tripleurospermum maritimum, scentless mayweed†
Tussilago farfara, colt's foot†
Nastanthus falklandicus, false-plantain*
Calyceraceae
Lobelia pratiana, berry-lobelia*

Dipsacales
Caprifoliaceae
Lonicera periclymenum, honeysuckle†
Sambucus nigra cv. 'Marginata', variegated elder†
Sambucus nigra f. laciniata, cut-leaved elder†
Sambucus nigra f. nigra, elder†
Valerianaceae
Valeriana sedifolia, valerian-bog*
Valerianella locusta, lamb's lettuce†

Apiales
Apiaceae
Anthriscus sylvestris, cow parsley†
Apium australe, wild celery*
Azorella filamentosa, wiry azorella*
Azorella lycopodioides, clubmoss azorella*
Azorella monantha, tufted azorella*
Azorella selago, cushion azorella*
Bolax gummifera, balsam-bog*
Conium maculatum, hemlock†
Heracleum sphondylium, hogweed†
Levisticum officinale, lovage†
Lilaeopsis macloviana, lilaeopsis*
Oreomyrrhis hookeri, Hooker's sweet cicely*
Schizeilema ranunculus, buttercup-parsley*
Araliaceae
Hedera helix, ivy†
Hydrocotylaceae
Hydrocotyle chamaemorus, marsh pennywort*

Alismatales
Juncaginaceae
Tetroncium magellanicum, arrowgrass*
Potamogetonaceae
Potamogeton linguatus,* pondweed*
Ruppiaceae
Ruppia filifolia, tasselweed*

Liliales
Alstroemeriaceae
Luzuriaga marginata, almond-flower*
Corsiaceae
Arachnitis uniflora, spider-flower*

Asparagales
Alliaceae
Allium schoenoprasum, chives†
Allium triquetrum, three-cornered garlic†
Narcissus pseudonarcissus, daffodil – Alliaceae
Narcissus sp., daffodil†
Asparagaceae
Hyacinthoides non-scripta, English bluebell†
Hyacinthoides × massartiana, hybrid bluebell†
Asteliaceae
Astelia pumila, soft-camp-bog*
Olsynium filifolium, pale maiden*
Iridaceae
Sisyrinchium chilense, yellow maiden*
Orchidaceae
Chloraea fonkii, Gaudichaud's orchid*
Codonorchis lessonii, dog orchid*
Gavilea australis, pale yellow orchid*
Gavilea littoralis, yellow orchid*
Xanthorrhoeaceae
Phormium tenax, New Zealand flax†

Poales
Centrolepidaceae
Gaimardia australis, gaimardia*
Cyperaceae
Carex acaulis, small dusky sedge*
Carex aematorrhyncha, blood-beak sedge*
Carex banksii, Banks' sedge*
Carex caduca, caducous sedge*
Carex canescens, white sedge*
Carex decidua, creek sedge*
Carex flacca, glaucous sedge†
Carex fuscula, dusky sedge*
Carex macloviana, Falkland sedge*
Carex magellanica, fuegian sedge*
Carex microglochin, bristle sedge*
Carex sagei, Sage's sedge*
Carex trifida, sword-grass*
Carex vallis-pulchrae, marsh sedge*
Eleocharis melanostachys, spike-rush*
Isolepis cernua, nodding club-rush*
Oreobolus obtusangulus, oreob / prickly-bog*
Schoenoplectus californicus, California club-rush*
Uncinia kingii, king's hook-sedge*
Uncinia macloviana, hook-sedge*
Juncaceae
Juncus articulatus, jointed rush†
Juncus bufonius, toad rush†
Juncus effusus, soft rush†
Juncus scheuchzerioides,* rush*
Luzula alopecurus,* wood-rush*
Luzula campestris, field wood-rush†
Luzula multiflora subsp. congesta, dense-headed heath wood-rush†
Luzula multiflora subsp. multiflora, heath wood-rush†
Marsippospermum grandiflorum, tall rush*
Rostkovia magellanica, short rush / brown rush*
Poaceae
Agrostis capillaris, common bent†
Agrostis magellanica, Fuegian bent*
Agrostis meyenii, Meyen's bent*
Agrostis stolonifera, creeping bent†
Aira caryophyllea, silver hair-grass†
Aira praecox, early hair-grass†
Alopecurus geniculatus, marsh foxtail†
Alopecurus magellanicus, Fuegian foxtail*
Ammophila arenaria, marram†
Anthoxanthum odoratum, sweet vernal-grass†
Arrhenatherum elatius, false oat-grass†
Avena sativa, oat†
Bromus catharticus, rescue brome†
Bromus condensatus, upright brome†
Bromus hordeaceus, soft brome†
Bromus sterilis, barren brome†
Cortaderia pilosa, whitegrass*
Cynosurus cristatus, crested dog's-tail†
Dactylis glomerata, cock's-foot†
Deschampsia antarctica, Antarctic hair-grass*
Deschampsia flexuosa, wavy hair-grass*
Deschampsia parvula, dwarf hair-grass*
Elymus farctus, sand couch†
Elymus magellanicus, Fuegian couch*
Elymus repens, common couch†
Festuca contracta, land-tussac*
Festuca filiformis, fine-leaved sheep's fescue – Poaceae
Festuca magellanica, Fuegian fescue*
Festuca ovina, sheep's fescue – Poaceae
Festuca pratensis, meadow fescue†
Festuca rubra, red fescue†
Hierochloe redolens, cinnamon-grass*
Holcus lanatus, Yorkshire fog†
Hordeum comosum, hairy barley†
Hordeum jubatum, foxtail barley†
Hordeum murinum, wall barley†
Koeleria permollis, Berg's hair-grass*
Leymus arenarius, lyme-grass†
Lolium multiflorum, Italian rye-grass – Poaceae
Lolium perenne, perennial rye-grass†
Phalaris arundinacea var. arundinacea, reed canary-grass†
Phalaris arundinacea var. picta, gardeners-garters†
Phleum pratense, timothy†
Poa alopecurus, bluegrass*
Poa annua, annual meadow-grass†
Poa flabellata, tussac / tussac-grass*
Poa pratensis, smooth-stalked meadow-grass†
Poa robusta, shore meadow-grass*
Poa trivialis, rough-stalked meadow-grass†
Puccinellia pusilla, dwarf saltmarsh-grass*
Stipa neaei, feathergrass†
Trisetum phleoides, spiked oat-grass*
Trisetum spicatum, spike trisetum†
Triticum aestivum, wheat†
Vulpia bromoides, squirreltail fescue†

References

 List